Beware of the dog refers to a warning sign indicating that a dangerous dog is within.

Beware of the dog or beware of dog may also refer to:

Books
 "Beware of the Dog" (short story), a short story by Roald Dahl

Music
 Beware of Dog (album), an album by Lil Bow Wow
 Beware of The Dogs (The Dogs album), a 1991 album by The Dogs
 Beware of the Dogs, a 2019 album Stella Donnelly
 Beware of the Dog!, an album by Hound Dog Taylor
 "Beware of the Dog" (song), a song by Jamelia
 "Beware of the Dog", the B-side to "The Ballad of Bonnie and Clyde" by Georgie Fame

TV and entertainment
 "Beware of the Dog" (Millennium), a season two episode of Millennium
 Beware of Dog (TV series), an American sitcom
 In Your House 8: Beware of Dog, a WWE pay-per-view event
 Beware of Dogs, a 2014 Indian film